Tekniska högskolan may refer to:
Helsinki University of Technology, a university in Helsinki, Finland. Official Swedish-language name: Tekniska högskolan.
Royal Institute of Technology, a university in Stockholm, Sweden, called Kungliga Tekniska högskolan or KTH in Swedish, but sometimes referred to as simply Tekniska högskolan.
Tekniska högskolan, a station in the Stockholm Metro.